State Route 154 (SR 154) is a primary state highway in the U.S. state of Virginia. The state highway runs  over two sections within the independent city of Covington. SR 154's  southern section connects Interstate 64 (I-64) with Locust Street. The  northern segment connects Lexington Avenue with U.S. Route 60 (US 60) and US 220.

Route description

SR 154 begins at a partial cloverleaf interchange with I-64. The roadway continues south as unnumbered Durant Road. SR 154 heads north as an extension of Durant Road, a four-lane divided highway that parallels a rail spur to a manufacturing plant in the southern part of the city. The state highway and rail spur diverge as they cross the Jackson River. North of the bridge, Durant Road splits north to continue along the rail line while SR 154's divided highway curves to the northwest along Craig Avenue, which passes through a commercial area and intersects another rail spur. The state highway reduces to a two-lane undivided street at Chestnut Street, after which the highway passes between the baseball and football fields of Covington High School. SR 154 continues through a residential area to its southern segment's northern terminus at Locust Street.

The northern segment of SR 154 begins at Lexington Avenue on the edge of downtown Covington; the route's disjoint sections are connected by Locust Street and Lexington Avenue. The state highway heads northeast as Riverside Drive through a residential area one block west of Main Street and to the east of the parallel Jackson River. At the north end of the downtown area, SR 154 intersects US 60 (Monroe Avenue) just east of the U.S. Highway's bridge over the Jackson River at its confluence with Dunlap Creek. The state highway passes under CSX's Alleghany Subdivision on the opposite side of the river from the WestRock factory complex. SR 154 intersects another rail spur at an oblique angle, then turns east onto Hickory Street to reach its northern terminus at US 220 (Alleghany Avenue).

Major intersections

References

External links

Virginia Highways Project: VA 154

154
State Route 154